Pou ( or ) is a virtual pet game for BlackBerry 10, iOS and Android developed and published by Lebanese designer Paul Salameh (listed as Zakeh on the Google Play Store). It is similar to Tamagotchi, a fad game that required caring for a simulated creature.

The player's Pou can interact with other Pous by visiting them when the game is connected to the Internet, or play games with other Pous as opponents via selected mini games which have Pou-vs-Pou (PvP) capability. The game connectivity is via Wi-Fi, Bluetooth, or Internet. It has user accounts in order to save and back up the game progress state, in case the device is cleared. The last game progress can be resumed by logging into the user's account. Users can transfer a Pou from one device to another regardless of the platform by logging out of their account from a device and logging into another device; however the application version must be the same between the two devices. In 2014, multilingual support was added.

On August 19, 2015, it was announced on Pou's official profile on Google+ that the game would get a new 3D treatment and that a new app would be released in the summer of that year. However, this new app was not launched for unknown reasons and official news is still awaited.

With the success of the game, it has been cloned using the name "Mou" on Windows Phone. Among other clones include the Moy franchise by Frojo Apps, the two My Boo games by Tapps Games, and the two My Chu games by Apofiss.

Pou disappeared for a few days in the Google Play Store in early December 2019 due to there being an update made to the game.

References

External links
 Pou website
 Pou at Google Play

2012 video games
Science fiction video games
Android (operating system) games
Virtual pets
BlackBerry PlayBook games
BlackBerry 10 games
IOS games
Video games developed in Lebanon